A sacrifice is the practice of offering food, or the lives of animals or people to the gods, as an act of propitiation or worship.

Sacrifice may also refer to:

Books
The Sacrifice, a 1956 novel by Adele Wiseman
Sacrifice, a 1985 thriller novel by Graham Masterton
Sacrifice, a 1991 novel by Andrew Vachss
The Sacrifice (The Fey), a 1995 novel by Kristine Kathryn Rusch
The Sacrifice (Applegate novel), a 2001 book in the Animorphs series
Sacrifice, a 2007 novel in the Legacy of the Force series
Left 4 Dead: The Sacrifice, a 2010 graphic novel
The Sacrifice (Higson novel), a 2011 young adult horror novel by Charlie Higson
Sacrifice, a 2012 fantasy novel by Cayla Kluver and the final book in the Legacy series
The Sacrifice (Oates novel), a 2015 novel by Joyce Carol Oates

Film
The Sacrifice (1909 film), a silent film
Sacrifice (1917 film), an American drama directed by Frank Reicher
The Sacrifice (1918 film), a German silent drama film
The Sacrifice (1979 film), a Turkish drama film
The Sacrifice (1986 film), directed by Andrei Tarkovsky
Sacrifice (2000 film), a TV movie directed by Mark L. Lester
The Sacrifice (2005 film), an independent film
Sacrifice (2010 film), a Chinese historical drama film directed by Chen Kaige
Sacrifice (2011 film), an American/Canadian thriller film 
Sacrifice (2014 film), an American thriller film
Sacrifice (2016 film), an American thriller film
 Jodi Ekdin, a 2019 Bangladeshi film known as The Sacrifice in English
The Sacrifice (2020 film), a Chinese war film
Sacrifice (2020 film), a British horror film

Games
Sacrifice (bridge), a strategy in bridge
Sacrifice (chess), a move in chess
Sacrifice (video game), a 2000 3D real-time strategy game

Music
Sacrifice (band), a Canadian thrash metal band
The Sacrifice (opera), a 2007 opera by James MacMillan with a libretto by Michael Symmons Roberts

Albums
Sacrifice (Black Widow album), 1970
Sacrifice (Divination album), 1998 album by American composer Bill Laswell
Sacrifice (For Love), 1991 release by Greg Sage
Sacrifice (Gary Numan album), 1994
Sacrifice (Motörhead album), 1995
Sacrifice (Saxon album), 2013
Sacrifice (Sylver album), 2009
Sacrifice (EP), a 1996 EP by Danzig
Sacrifice, 2011 EP by Versailles
Sacrifices (album), a 2018 album by Guillermo Scott Heren under his alias Prefuse 73

Songs
"Sacrifice" (Bebe Rexha song), 2021
"Sacrifices" (Big Sean song), 2017
"Sacrifices" (Dreamville, EarthGang and J. Cole song), 2019
"Sacrifice" (Elton John song), 1989
"Sacrifice" (The Weeknd song), 2022
 "Sacrifice", a song by Black Atlass from the soundtrack to the film Fifty Shades Freed, 2018
 "Sacrifices", a song by Drake from his mixtape More Life, 2017

Television 
"Sacrifice" (Angel), a 2003 episode of Angel
"Sacrifice" (Arrow), a 2013 episode of Arrow
"Sacrifice" (Battlestar Galactica), a 2006 episode of Battlestar Galactica
"Sacrifice" (Blade: The Series), a 2006 episode of Blade: The Series
Sacrifice (Derren Brown special), a 2018 special by Derren Brown
"The Sacrifice" (Fear Itself), a 2008 episode of Fear Itself
Sacrifice (The Following), a 2014 episode of the psychological thriller television series The Following
Sacrifice (Revenge), a 2013 episode of television series Revenge
"Sacrifice" (The Secret Circle), a 2012 episode of The Secret Circle
"Sacrifices" (Stargate SG-1), a 2004 episode of Stargate SG-1
Sacrifice (Supernatural), a 2013 episode of the paranormal drama television series Supernatural
"Sacrifice" (The Unit), a 2008 episode of The Unit
"The Sacrifice" (The Vampire Diaries), a 2010 episode of The Vampire Diaries
"Sacrifice" is Episode 25 of Freeform's 2018 mermaid show Siren
"Sacrifice", an episode of The Good Doctor

Art
Sacrifice (painting), 2013 painting by Robert B. Sherman

Sports
Sacrifice bunt, a related baseball maneuver
Sacrifice fly, a baseball maneuver
Impact Wrestling Sacrifice, formerly Total Nonstop Action Wrestling Sacrifice, a pay-per-view event

See also
Sacrifice play (disambiguation)